Nartanasala may refer to:
 Nartanasala (1963 film), an Indian Telugu-language Hindu mythological film
 Nartanasala (2018 film), an Indian Telugu-language romantic comedy film